Marine pollution occurs when substances used or spread by humans, such as industrial, agricultural and residential waste, particles, noise, excess carbon dioxide or invasive organisms enter the ocean and cause harmful effects there. The majority of this waste (80%) comes from land-based activity, although marine transportation significantly contributes as well. Since most inputs come from land, either via the rivers, sewage or the atmosphere, it means that continental shelves are more vulnerable to pollution. Air pollution is also a contributing factor by carrying off iron, carbonic acid, nitrogen, silicon, sulfur, pesticides or dust particles into the ocean. The pollution often comes from nonpoint sources such as agricultural runoff, wind-blown debris, and dust. These nonpoint sources are largely due to runoff that enters the ocean through rivers, but wind-blown debris and dust can also play a role, as these pollutants can settle into waterways and oceans. Pathways of pollution include direct discharge, land runoff, ship pollution, atmospheric pollution and, potentially, deep sea mining.

The types of marine pollution can be grouped as pollution from marine debris, plastic pollution, including microplastics, ocean acidification, nutrient pollution, toxins and underwater noise. Plastic pollution in the ocean is a type of marine pollution by plastics, ranging in size from large original material such as bottles and bags, down to microplastics formed from the fragmentation of plastic material. Marine debris is mainly discarded human rubbish which floats on, or is suspended in the ocean. Plastic pollution is harmful to marine life.

Another concern is the runoff of nutrients (nitrogen and phosphorus) from intensive agriculture, and the disposal of untreated or partially treated sewage to rivers and subsequently oceans. These nitrogen and phosphorus nutrients (which are also contained in fertilizers) stimulate phytoplankton and macroalgal growth, which can lead to harmful algal blooms (eutrophication) which can be harmful to humans as well as marine creatures. Excessive algal growth can also smother sensitive coral reefs and lead to loss of biodiversity and coral health. A second major concern is that the degradation of algal blooms can lead to consumption of oxygen in coastal waters, a situation that may worsen with climate change as warming reduces vertical mixing of the water column.

Many potentially toxic chemicals adhere to tiny particles which are then taken up by plankton and benthic animals, most of which are either deposit feeders or filter feeders. In this way, the toxins are concentrated upward within ocean food chains. When pesticides are incorporated into the marine ecosystem, they quickly become absorbed into marine food webs. Once in the food webs, these pesticides can cause mutations, as well as diseases, which can be harmful to humans as well as the entire food web. Toxic metals can also be introduced into marine food webs. These can cause a change to tissue matter, biochemistry, behavior, reproduction, and suppress growth in marine life. Also, many animal feeds have a high fish meal or fish hydrolysate content. In this way, marine toxins can be transferred to land animals, and appear later in meat and dairy products.

Pathways of pollution
There are many ways to categorize and examine the inputs of pollution into marine ecosystems. There are three main types of inputs of pollution into the ocean: direct discharge of waste into the oceans, runoff into the waters due to rain, and pollutants released from the atmosphere.

One common path of entry by contaminants to the sea are rivers. The evaporation of water from oceans exceeds precipitation. The balance is restored by rain over the continents entering rivers and then being returned to the sea. The Hudson River in New York State and the Raritan River in New Jersey, which empty at the northern and southern ends of Staten Island, are a source of mercury contamination of zooplankton (copepods) in the open ocean. It takes a few days before toxins are taken up by the plankton.

Pollution is often classed as point source or nonpoint source pollution. Point source pollution occurs when there is a single, identifiable, localized source of the pollution. An example is directly discharging sewage and industrial waste into the ocean. Pollution such as this occurs particularly in developing nations. Nonpoint source pollution occurs when the pollution is from ill-defined and diffuse sources. These can be difficult to regulate. Agricultural runoff and wind blown debris are prime examples.

Direct discharge

Pollutants enter rivers and the sea directly from urban sewerage and industrial waste discharges, sometimes in the form of hazardous and toxic wastes, or in the form of plastics.

In a study published by Science, Jambeck et al. (2015) estimated that the 10 largest emitters of oceanic plastic pollution worldwide are, from the most to the least, China, Indonesia, Philippines, Vietnam, Sri Lanka, Thailand, Egypt, Malaysia, Nigeria, and Bangladesh.

Inland mining for copper, gold, etc., is another source of marine pollution. Most of the pollution is simply soil, which ends up in rivers flowing to the sea. However, some minerals discharged in the course of the mining can cause problems, such as copper, a common industrial pollutant, which can interfere with the life history and development of coral polyps. Mining has a poor environmental track record. For example, according to the United States Environmental Protection Agency, mining has contaminated portions of the headwaters of over 40% of watersheds in the western continental US. Much of this pollution finishes up in the sea.

Land runoff

Surface runoff from farming, as well as urban runoff and runoff from the construction of roads, buildings, ports, channels, and harbours, can carry soil and particles laden with carbon, nitrogen, phosphorus, and minerals. This nutrient-rich water can cause fleshy algae and phytoplankton to thrive in coastal areas; known as algal blooms, which have the potential to create hypoxic conditions by using all available oxygen. In the coast of southwest Florida, harmful algal blooms have existed for over 100 years. These algal blooms have been a cause of species of fish, turtles, dolphins, and shrimp to die and cause harmful effects on humans who swim in the water.

Polluted runoff from roads and highways can be a significant source of water pollution in coastal areas. About 75% of the toxic chemicals that flow into Puget Sound are carried by stormwater that runs off paved roads and driveways, rooftops, yards and other developed land. In California, there are many rainstorms that runoff into the ocean. These rainstorms occur from October to March, and these runoff waters contain petroleum, heavy metals, pollutants from emissions, etc.

In China, there is a large coastal population that pollutes the ocean through land runoff. This includes sewage discharge and pollution from urbanization and land use. In 2001, more than 66,795 mi2 of the Chinese coastal ocean waters were rated less than Class I of the Sea Water Quality Standard of China. Much of this pollution came from Ag, Cu, Cd, Pb, As, DDT, PCBs, etc., which occurred from contamination through land runoff.

Ship pollution

Ships can pollute waterways and oceans in many ways. Oil spills can have devastating effects. In addition to being toxic to marine life, polycyclic aromatic hydrocarbons (PAHs), found in crude oil, are very difficult to clean up, and last for years in the sediment and marine environment.

Oil spills are probably the most emotive of marine pollution events. However, while a tanker wreck may result in extensive newspaper headlines, much of the oil in the world's seas comes from other smaller sources, such as tankers discharging ballast water from oil tanks used on return ships, leaking pipelines or engine oil disposed of down sewers.

Discharge of cargo residues from bulk carriers can pollute ports, waterways, and oceans. In many instances vessels intentionally discharge illegal wastes despite foreign and domestic regulation prohibiting such actions. An absence of national standards provides an incentive for some cruise liners to dump waste in places where the penalties are inadequate. It has been estimated that container ships lose over 10,000 containers at sea each year (usually during storms). Ships also create noise pollution that disturbs natural wildlife, and water from ballast tanks can spread harmful algae and other invasive species.

Ballast water taken up at sea and released in port is a major source of unwanted exotic marine life. The invasive freshwater zebra mussels, native to the Black, Caspian, and Azov seas, were probably transported to the Great Lakes via ballast water from a transoceanic vessel. Meinesz believes that one of the worst cases of a single invasive species causing harm to an ecosystem can be attributed to a seemingly harmless jellyfish. Mnemiopsis leidyi, a species of comb jellyfish that spread so it now inhabits estuaries in many parts of the world, was first introduced in 1982, and thought to have been transported to the Black Sea in a ship's ballast water. The population of the jellyfish grew exponentially and, by 1988, it was wreaking havoc upon the local fishing industry. "The anchovy catch fell from 204,000 tons in 1984 to 200 tons in 1993; sprat from 24,600 tons in 1984 to 12,000 tons in 1993; horse mackerel from 4,000 tons in 1984 to zero in 1993." Now that the jellyfish have exhausted the zooplankton, including fish larvae, their numbers have fallen dramatically, yet they continue to maintain a stranglehold on the ecosystem.

Invasive species can take over once occupied areas, facilitate the spread of new diseases, introduce new genetic material, alter underwater seascapes, and jeopardize the ability of native species to obtain food. Invasive species are responsible for about $138 billion annually in lost revenue and management costs in the US alone.

Atmospheric pollution

Another pathway of pollution occurs through the atmosphere. The ocean has long been affected by the passage of chemicals from the atmosphere (e.g. nutrient source; pH influence). Wind-blown dust and debris, including plastic bags, are blown seaward from landfills and other areas. Dust from the Sahara moving around the southern periphery of the subtropical ridge moves into the Caribbean and Florida during the warm season as the ridge builds and moves northward through the subtropical Atlantic. Dust can also be attributed to a global transport from the Gobi and Taklamakan deserts across Korea, Japan, and the Northern Pacific to the Hawaiian Islands.

Since 1970, dust outbreaks have worsened due to periods of drought in Africa. There is a large variability in dust transport to the Caribbean and Florida from year to year; however, the flux is greater during positive phases of the North Atlantic Oscillation. The USGS links dust events to a decline in the health of coral reefs across the Caribbean and Florida, primarily since the 1970s.

Climate change is raising ocean temperatures and raising levels of carbon dioxide in the atmosphere. These rising levels of carbon dioxide are acidifying the oceans. This, in turn, is altering aquatic ecosystems and modifying fish distributions, with impacts on the sustainability of fisheries and the livelihoods of the communities that depend on them. Healthy ocean ecosystems are also important for the mitigation of climate change.

Deep sea mining
Some of the potential toxic metals include copper, zinc, cadmium, lead as well as rare earth elements such as lanthanum and yttrium.  Following the release of toxins there is an increase of noise, light, sediment le dan plumes and elements that have the potential to impact the ecosystems.

Deep sea minerals (DSM) can be extremely beneficial, it can cause wealth, raising living standards as well as economic opportunities for both current and future generations.  In addition, if the wealth is poorly managed it can have the potential to cause great economic and social damage . The instability of price and production levels of minerals can cause an external economic shock leading to a significant backlash on the domestic economy.

Types of pollution

Marine debris pollution

Plastic pollution

Ocean acidification

Nutrient pollution

Eutrophication is an increase in chemical nutrients, typically compounds containing nitrogen or phosphorus, in an ecosystem. It can result in an increase in the ecosystem's primary productivity (excessive plant growth and decay), and further effects including lack of oxygen and severe reductions in water quality, fish, and other animal populations. Nutrient pollution, a form of water pollution, refers to contamination by excessive inputs of nutrients. It is a primary cause of eutrophication of surface waters, in which excess nutrients, usually nitrates or phosphates, stimulate algae growth. Such blooms are naturally occurring but may be increasing as a result of anthropogenic inputs or alternatively may be something that is now more closely monitored and so more frequently reported.

The biggest culprit are rivers that empty into the ocean, and with it the many chemicals used as fertilizers in agriculture as well as waste from livestock and humans. An excess of oxygen-depleting chemicals in the water can lead to hypoxia and the creation of a dead zone.

Estuaries tend to be naturally eutrophic because land-derived nutrients are concentrated where runoff enters the marine environment in a confined channel. The World Resources Institute has identified 375 hypoxic coastal zones around the world, concentrated in coastal areas in Western Europe, the Eastern and Southern coasts of the US, and East Asia, particularly in Japan. In the ocean, there are frequent red tide algae blooms that kill fish and marine mammals and cause respiratory problems in humans and some domestic animals when the blooms reach close to shore.

In addition to land runoff, atmospheric anthropogenic fixed nitrogen can enter the open ocean. A study in 2008 found that this could account for around one third of the ocean's external (non-recycled) nitrogen supply and up to three per cent of the annual new marine biological production. It has been suggested that accumulating reactive nitrogen in the environment may have consequences as serious as putting carbon dioxide in the atmosphere.

One proposed solution to eutrophication in estuaries is to restore shellfish populations, such as oysters. Oyster reefs remove nitrogen from the water column and filter out suspended solids, subsequently reducing the likelihood or extent of harmful algal blooms or anoxic conditions. Filter feeding activity is considered beneficial to water quality by controlling phytoplankton density and sequestering nutrients, which can be removed from the system through shellfish harvest, buried in the sediments, or lost through denitrification. Foundational work toward the idea of improving marine water quality through shellfish cultivation to was conducted by Odd Lindahl et al., using mussels in Sweden.

Toxicants

Apart from plastics, there are particular problems with other toxic pollutants that either do not break down or only very slowly in the marine environment. Examples of persistent toxicants are PCBs, DDT, TBT, pesticides, furans, dioxins, phenols, and radioactive waste. Heavy metals are metallic chemical elements that have a relatively high density and are toxic or poisonous at low concentrations. Examples are mercury, lead, copper and cadmium. Some toxicants can accumulate in the tissues of many species of aquatic life in a process called bioaccumulation. They are also known to accumulate in benthic environments, such as estuaries and bay muds: a geological record of human activities of the last century.

Specific examples
 Chinese and Russian industrial pollution such as phenols and heavy metals in the Amur River have devastated fish stocks and damaged its estuary soil.
 Acute and chronic pollution events have been shown to impact southern California kelp forests, though the intensity of the impact seems to depend on both the nature of the contaminants and duration of exposure.
 Due to their high position in the food chain and the subsequent accumulation of heavy metals from their diet, mercury levels can be high in larger species such as bluefin and albacore. As a result, in March 2004 the United States FDA issued guidelines recommending that pregnant women, nursing mothers and children limit their intake of tuna and other types of predatory fish.
 Some shellfish and crabs can survive polluted environments, accumulating heavy metals or toxins in their tissues. For example, mitten crabs have a remarkable ability to survive in highly modified aquatic habitats, including polluted waters. The farming and harvesting of such species needs careful management if they are to be used as a food.
 Surface runoff of pesticides can alter the gender of fish species genetically, transforming male into female fish.
 Heavy metals enter the environment through oil spills – such as the Prestige oil spill on the Galician coast and Gulf of Mexico which unleashed an estimated 3.19 million barrels of oil – or from other natural or anthropogenic sources.
 In 2005, the 'Ndrangheta, an Italian mafia syndicate, was accused of sinking at least 30 ships loaded with toxic waste, much of it radioactive. This has led to widespread investigations into radioactive waste disposal rackets.
 Since the end of World War II, various nations, including the Soviet Union, the United Kingdom, the United States, and Germany, have disposed of chemical weapons in the Baltic Sea, raising concerns of environmental contamination.
 The Fukushima Daiichi nuclear disaster in 2011 caused radioactive toxins from the damaged power plant to leak into the air and ocean. There are still many isotopes in the ocean, which directly affects the benthic food web and also affects the whole food chain. The concentration of 137Cs in the bottom sediment that was contaminated by water with high concentrations in April–May 2011 remains quite high and is showing signs of very slow decrease with time.

Underwater noise

Marine life can be susceptible to noise or the sound pollution from sources such as passing ships, oil exploration seismic surveys, and naval low-frequency active sonar. Sound travels more rapidly and over larger distances in the sea than in the atmosphere. Marine animals, such as cetaceans, often have weak eyesight, and live in a world largely defined by acoustic information. This applies also to many deeper sea fish, who live in a world of darkness. Between 1950 and 1975, ambient noise at one location in the Pacific Ocean increased by about ten decibels (that is a tenfold increase in intensity).

Noise also makes species communicate louder, which is called the Lombard vocal response. Whale songs are longer when submarine-detectors are on. If creatures don't "speak" loud enough, their voice can be masked by anthropogenic sounds. These unheard voices might be warnings, finding of prey, or preparations of net-bubbling. When one species begins speaking louder, it will mask other species voices, causing the whole ecosystem to eventually speak louder.

According to the oceanographer Sylvia Earle, "Undersea noise pollution is like the death of a thousand cuts. Each sound in itself may not be a matter of critical concern, but taken all together, the noise from shipping, seismic surveys, and military activity is creating a totally different environment than existed even 50 years ago. That high level of noise is bound to have a hard, sweeping impact on life in the sea."

Noise from ships and human activity can damage Cnidarians and Ctenophora, which are very important organisms in the marine ecosystem. They promote high diversity and they are used as models for ecology and biology because of their simple structures. When there is underwater noise, the vibrations in the water damage the cilia hairs in the Coelenterates. In a study, the organisms were exposed to sound waves for different numbers of times and the results showed that damaged hair cells were extruded or missing or presented bent, flaccid or missed kinocilia and stereocilia. Ships can be certified to meet certain noise criteria.

Other 
There are a variety of secondary effects stemming not from the original pollutant, but a derivative condition. An example is silt-bearing surface runoff, which can inhibit the penetration of sunlight through the water column, hampering photosynthesis in aquatic plants.

Mitigation
Much anthropogenic pollution ends up in the ocean. The 2011 edition of the United Nations Environment Programme Year Book identifies as the main emerging environmental issues the loss to the oceans of massive amounts of phosphorus, "a valuable fertilizer needed to feed a growing global population", and the impact billions of pieces of plastic waste are having globally on the health of marine environments.

Bjorn Jennssen (2003) notes in his article, "Anthropogenic pollution may reduce biodiversity and productivity of marine ecosystems, resulting in reduction and depletion of human marine food resources". There are two ways the overall level of this pollution can be mitigated: either the human population is reduced, or a way is found to reduce the ecological footprint left behind by the average human. If the second way is not adopted, then the first way may be imposed as the world ecosystems falter.

The second way is for humans, individually, to pollute less. That requires social and political will, together with a shift in awareness so more people respect the environment and are less disposed to abuse it. At an operational level, regulations, and international government participation is needed. It is often very difficult to regulate marine pollution because pollution spreads over international barriers, thus making regulations hard to create as well as enforce.

Without appropriate awareness of marine pollution, the necessary global will to effectively address the issues may prove inadequate. Balanced information on the sources and harmful effects of marine pollution need to become part of general public awareness, and ongoing research is required to fully establish, and keep current, the scope of the issues. As expressed in Daoji and Dag's research, one of the reasons why environmental concern is lacking among the Chinese is because the public awareness is low and therefore should be targeted.

The amount of awareness on marine pollution is vital to the support of keeping the prevention of trash from entering waterways and ending up in our oceans.  The EPA reports that in 2014 Americans generated about 258 million tons of waste, and only a third was recycled or composted.  In 2015, there was over 8 million tons of plastic that made it into the ocean.  The Ocean Conservancy reported that China, Indonesia, Philippines, Thailand, and Vietnam dump more plastic in the sea than all other countries combined. Through more sustainable packing this could lead to; eliminating toxic constituents, using fewer materials, making more readily available recyclable plastic.  However, awareness can only take these initiatives so far.  The most abundant plastic is PET (Polyethylene terephthalate) and is the most resistant to biodegradables.  Researchers have been making great strides in combating this problem.  In one way has been by adding a special polymer called a tetrablock copolymer.  The tetrablock copolymer acts as a laminate between the PE and iPP which enables for an easier breakdown but still be tough.  Through more awareness, individuals will become more cognizant of their carbon footprints. Also, from research and technology, more strides can be made to aid in the plastic pollution problem.Jellyfish have been considered a potential mitigating organism for pollution.

Global goals 
In 2017, the United Nations adopted a resolution establishing Sustainable Development Goals, including reduced marine pollution as a measured goal under Goal 14. The international community has agreed that reducing pollution in the oceans is a priority, which is tracked as part of Sustainable Development Goal 14 which actively seeks to undo these human impacts on the oceans. The title of Target 14.1 is: "By 2025, prevent and significantly reduce marine pollution of all kinds, in particular from land-based activities, including marine debris and nutrient pollution."

History 

Although marine pollution has a long history, significant international laws to counter it were not enacted until the twentieth century. Marine pollution was a concern during several United Nations Conventions on the Law of the Sea beginning in the 1950s. Most scientists believed that the oceans were so vast that they had unlimited ability to dilute, and thus render pollution harmless.

In the late 1950s and early 1960s, there were several controversies about dumping radioactive waste off the coasts of the United States by companies licensed by the Atomic Energy Commission, into the Irish Sea from the British reprocessing facility at Windscale, and into the Mediterranean Sea by the French Commissariat à l'Energie Atomique. After the Mediterranean Sea controversy, for example, Jacques Cousteau became a worldwide figure in the campaign to stop marine pollution. Marine pollution made further international headlines after the 1967 crash of the oil tanker Torrey Canyon, and after the 1969 Santa Barbara oil spill off the coast of California.

Marine pollution was a major area of discussion during the 1972 United Nations Conference on the Human Environment, held in Stockholm. That year also saw the signing of the Convention on the Prevention of Marine Pollution by Dumping of Wastes and Other Matter, sometimes called the London Convention. The London Convention did not ban marine pollution, but it established black and gray lists for substances to be banned (black) or regulated by national authorities (gray). Cyanide and high-level radioactive waste, for example, were put on the black list. The London Convention applied only to waste dumped from ships, and thus did nothing to regulate waste discharged as liquids from pipelines.

Society and culture

Laws and policies 
There are different ways for the ocean to get polluted, therefore there have been multiple laws, policies, and treaties put into place throughout history. In order to protect the ocean from marine pollution, policies have been developed internationally.
 In 1948, Harry Truman signed a law formerly known as the Federal Water Pollution Control Act that allowed the federal government to control marine pollution in United States of America.
 In 1972, the Marine Protection, Research, and Sanctuaries Act of 1972 (MPRSA) was passed by the United States Congress, and regulates ocean dumping of waste in US waters.
 The 1954 Convention for the Prevention of Pollution of the Sea by Oil and the 1973 International Convention for the Prevention of Pollution by Ships were weakly enforced due to a lack of respect for the laws from flag states.
 In 1973 and 1978, MARPOL 73/78 was a treaty written to control vessel pollution, especially regarding oil. In 1983, the International Convention for the Prevention of Pollution from Ships enforced the MARPOL 73/78 treaty internationally.
 The 1982 United Nations Convention on the Law of the Sea (UNCLOS) was established to protect the marine environment by governing states to control their pollution to the ocean. It put restrictions on the amount of toxins and pollutants that come from all ships internationally.
 In 2006, the Marine Debris Research, Prevention and Reduction Ac. It was established by the National Oceanic and Atmospheric Administration (NOAA) to help identify, determine the source of, reduce and prevent marine debris.
 In December 2017, the UN Environmental Agency (UNEA) established the Ad Hoc Open-Ended Expert Group on Marine Litter and Microplastics with the purpose of examining marine plastic pollutions and to evaluate ways to handle the issue.

See also 

 Aquatic toxicology
 Environmental impact of pesticides
 Mercury pollution in the ocean
 National Cleanup Day
 Oil pollution toxicity to marine fish
 Plasticosis
 Stockholm Convention on Persistent Organic Pollutants
 Sea snot
 World Oceans Day

References

Further reading
 

 
Pollution
Sanitation